Live Europaturnén MCMXCVII is a live album by Pavement, which was recorded at a concert in Europe in 1997.  Though it was originally planned for official release on Matador Records that same year, it was not actually released until 2008. Only available in 12" vinyl format, the album was included as part of a bonus offer for those who pre-ordered Brighten the Corners: Nicene Creedence Edition - the deluxe re-issue edition of Pavement's 1997 album Brighten the Corners - from certain independent record shops.

The song titles for Live Europaturnén MCMXCVII are listed only on the record labels, and not on the actual album sleeve.  Most of them also differ in spelling, or are entirely different from what is listed on the band's studio albums for the same songs.

Reception
The record's belated release has been met with a positive critical response. Monday Field of Frank Booth Review gave the album 90/100, championing not only the strong performances, but also the production and choice of format, stating that "like Pavement’s early work, this was made for vinyl ... its playful warmth radiates through every groove."

Track listing

There are two versions of this release with slightly varying actual track listing, neither of which matches the following listing on the label:

Side A

(titles as printed on label)
 "Father To Sister Thought"
 "Shady Layne"
 "Silence Kid" 
 "Stereo"
 "Remake/Remodel" 
 "Blue Hawaii"
 "Painted Soldiers"

Side B

(titles as printed on label)
 "Cut Your Hare"
 "Stopp Breathing"
 "Joe Boyd (Stringband)" 
 "Loretta Scars"
 "Tusk" (Fin)
 "Range Lifer"

Actual Listing (Version 1)
 Father to a Sister of Thought
 Shady Lane
 Silence Kit
 Stereo
 Type Slowly
 Blue Hawaiian
 Painted Soldiers
 Cut Your Hair
 Stop Breathing
 We are Underused
 Loretta's Scars
 Fin
 Range Life

Actual Listing (Version 2)
 Shady Lane
 And Then
 Date w. IKEA
 Transport is Arranged
 Stereo
 Kennel District
 Cut Your Hair
 Fin
 Blue Hawaiian
 Grave Architecture

References

Pavement (band) albums
2008 live albums
Matador Records live albums